Hypolycaena amanica is a butterfly in the family Lycaenidae. It is found in Tanzania (the north-eastern part of the country, as well as the Usambara and Ulunguru mountains).

References

Endemic fauna of Tanzania
Butterflies described in 1951
Hypolycaenini